Glyphocrangonidae is a family of crustaceans belonging to the order Decapoda.

Genera:
 Armacrangon Charbonnier, Audo, Garassino & Hyžný, 2017
 Gladicrangon Charbonnier, Audo, Garassino & Hyžný, 2017
 Glyphocrangon Milne-Edwards, 1881

References

Decapods
Decapod families